Temperature's Rising is a compilation album released in 1995 by the Canadian rock band Loverboy. The album was the third compilation by the band, but this particular compilation aimed at the more rarely heard songs by the band, and the minor hits that the previous compilations did not cover.

Track listing

Personnel
Mike Reno - lead vocals
Paul Dean - guitar, backing vocals
Doug Johnson - keyboards
Scott Smith - bass  
Matt Frenette - drums
Bruce Fairbairn - producer



1995 compilation albums
Loverboy albums
Albums produced by Bruce Fairbairn
Sony Music Canada compilation albums